Jens Wilken Hornemann (6 March 1770 – 30 July 1841) was a Danish botanist.

Biography
He was a lecturer at the University of Copenhagen Botanical Garden from 1801. After the death of Martin Vahl in 1804, the task of publishing the Flora Danica was given to Hornemann, who subsequently issued fasc. 22-39 (1801–1840) with a total of 1080 plates.
J.W. Hornemann was professor of botany at the University of Copenhagen from 1808 and director of the Botanic Garden (from 1817). In 1815, he was elected a corresponding member of the Royal Swedish Academy of Sciences, and in 1816, his status was changed to that of foreign member.

Honours 
Several plant genera have been named in his honour, however for reasons of taxonomy and nomenclature all names are today synonyms. Hornemannia Willd. (1809), once placed in Scrophulariaceae, contained on two species, both of which are now referred to other genera (one to the genus Mazus Lour. (1790) and the other to Lindernia All. (1766)). This fact prohibits the use of the names Hornemannia Vahl (1810) for the Caribbean genus of Ericaceae (now to be called Symphysia C.B. Presl (1827)) and Hornemannia Benth. (1846) for the East Asiatic genus of Scrophulariaceae (now to be called Ellisiophyllum Maxim. (1871)).

He is also commemorated in the specific epithets for the bird Carduelis hornemanni (Arctic Redpoll), the flowering plant Epilobium hornemannii Rchb. (Hornemann's willowherb) and the agaric fungus Stropharia hornemannii (Fr.) S. Lundell & Nannf. (1934).

Private life
Hans Christian Andersen was a frequent visitor in Hornemann's home in Copenhagen. Andersen used him as model for "the Professor of Botany", who understands the gestures of the flowers, in the tale "Little Ida's Flowers".

References

1770 births
1841 deaths
18th-century Danish botanists
Academic staff of the University of Copenhagen
Members of the Royal Swedish Academy of Sciences
19th-century Danish botanists